Artis Ate (born 29 July 1989) is a Latvian professional basketball player, who plays the shooting guard and small forward position. He currently plays for Latvian team VEF Rīga.

References 

1989 births
Living people
Latvian men's basketball players
People from Rucava Parish